Pierre-Étienne Laporte (September 23, 1934 – January 30, 2020) was a Canadian politician, who represented the electoral district of Outremont in the National Assembly of Quebec from 1996 to 2003. He was a member of the Quebec Liberal Party.

References

1934 births
2020 deaths
Quebec Liberal Party MNAs
People from Joliette
21st-century Canadian politicians